Falnuée Castle ( is a château-ferme (castle farm) in Mazy, in the municipality of Gembloux, province of Namur, Wallonia, Belgium.

It is now a golf clubhouse.

See also
List of castles in Belgium

References

External links
 — picture of the castle.

Castles in Belgium
Castles in Namur (province)
Gembloux